Tsvyatovo is a village in Dzhebel Municipality, Kardzhali Province, southern Bulgaria.

The village has only 3 inhabitants as of 2011.

References

Villages in Kardzhali Province